Letter to the President may refer to
 Letter To The President (song), 1999 song by Tupac Shakur.
 A Letter to the President, 2017 film by Roya Sadat.